Saint Paul's Church is a historic Episcopal church located at Waterloo in Seneca County, New York.  It was constructed in 1863-1864 and is a masonry church built of local limestone in the Gothic Revival style.  The 52 feet by 72 feet church features a tower with a stone spire and clock.  A large two story rough cut limestone parish house was built in 1916.

After 1856 the church built St. John's Chapel on Chapel Street in Waterloo. The land was purchased by Jane Hunt, a Quaker known for support of women's rights.

It was listed on the National Register of Historic Places in 1997.

References

External links

St. Paul's Episcopal Church website

Churches on the National Register of Historic Places in New York (state)
Episcopal church buildings in New York (state)
Churches completed in 1864
19th-century Episcopal church buildings
Churches in Seneca County, New York
National Register of Historic Places in Seneca County, New York
Waterloo, New York